Has Anybody Seen My Gal? is a 1952 comedy film distributed by Universal-International, directed by Douglas Sirk, and stars Piper Laurie, Rock Hudson, Charles Coburn, and Gigi Perreau. It is loosely based upon the Eleanor Porter novel ,"Oh Money! Money!". Set in the 1920s, the film leans heavily on period detail, such as flappers, the Charleston and raccoon coats. It is named for the jazz song "Has Anybody Seen My Gal?" which was a hit for The California Ramblers during the '20s. Though the song is sung during the movie, its lyrics have no particular relation to the plot.

Plot
The year is 1928. Samuel Fulton (Charles Coburn) is an old and lonely New York millionaire who has decided to leave his fortune to the family of the late Millicent Blaisdell. Millicent is the only woman he has ever been in love with and they briefly dated, until she dumped him because she did not return his love. Samuel explains to his lawyer Edward Norton (Frank Ferguson) that losing the love of his life was what inspired him to build up a career as a wealthy businessman, eventually becoming the richest man in the world. Fearing the family will spend the money the wrong way, he decides to visit them in a small Vermont town, faking a newspaper advertisement to board a room under the alias John Smith.

The family is initially reluctant to take in Samuel, but Roberta, the youngest daughter, (Gigi Perreau) wastes no time and makes him feel as welcome as possible. He notices that the Blaisdells are a happy family who, although poor, are proud of their background. Father Charles (Larry Gates) has taught the family not to put a value on materialistic products. Nevertheless, mother Harriet (Lynn Bari) wishes for her daughter Millicent (Piper Laurie) to marry Carl Pennock (Skip Homeier), a wealthy but snobbish young man who could buy Millicent everything that Harriet never had. Millicent, however, is not keen on Carl and prefers to marry Dan Stebbins (Rock Hudson), a charming but poor soda jerk. While staying at the Blaisdells, 'John' is given a job at Dan's store as soda jerk.

One night, Millie and Dan announce their engagement, which upsets Harriet. Shortly after, Norton arrives, announcing the family has inherited $100,000 from an unknown man. When realizing Norton is not joking, the family – especially Harriet – immediately gives up their humble life for the upper-class life style. Charles is not enthusiastic of his wife's sudden craze of materialism, but allows her to buy whatever she wants. The oldest son Howard (William Reynolds) immediately starts gambling a large amount of money and lands a debt, which prompts Samuel to help him. Meanwhile, Dan, feeling he could never live up to Millie's expectations, breaks off their engagement. Afterwards, Millie reluctantly starts dating Carl again, much under the pressure of her mother.

Samuel helps both Millie and Howard escape from a raid, which results in his being jailed. Soon, Harriet feels that Samuel's presence is ruining the family image, unaware of the reason why he ended up in jail. In this period, he is supported only by Dan, who admits his intentions of leaving town to build a career. Trying to prevent Millie and Dan from disappearing out of each other's life, he sets up a meeting at the cinema. There, an argument follows, and Millie exclaims her hatred for the family's sudden wealth, complaining that it is the cause of all bad things happening to her. She is comforted by Samuel, and thereby attracts the attention of other theatre-goers, who suspect that Sam and Millie were necking.

During the ongoing social party at Blaisdell's house, there is gossip of the necking in the cinema, which prompts Harriet to force Millie to announce her engagement to Carl. Meanwhile, Charles announces he has lost his investments, which makes Samuel realize that the Blaisdells are in no position of making wise financial decisions. Obligated by Samuel, Norton refuses a loan, after which Charles begs the Pennocks for money. Pennock Senior (Paul McVey) refuses the loan to Charles and leaves with wife and son Carl the party, which makes clear that the engagement is off.  Much to Harriet's distress, the Blaisdell family returns to their old lifestyle. At the end, Roberta reveals that 'John' has won the first prize at an art show, having secretly entered his paintings. Samuel immediately leaves the house to avoid the press, and realizes that the Blaisdells now think of him as the grandfather he could have been.

Cast
Piper Laurie as Millicent 'Millie' Blaisdell
Rock Hudson as Dan Stebbins
Charles Coburn as Samuel Fulton/John Smith
Gigi Perreau as Roberta Blaisdell
Lynn Bari as Harriet Blaisdell
Larry Gates as Charles Blaisdell
William Reynolds as Howard Blaisdell
Skip Homeier as Carl Pennock
Paul McVey as Lester Pennock
Gloria Holden as Clarissa Pennock
Frank Ferguson as Edward Norton
Paul Harvey as Judge Wilkins
Sally Creighton as Arline Benson
James Dean as Youth at Soda Fountain (uncredited)
Philo McCullough as Mr. Benson (uncredited)
Jack Mower as Court Clerk (uncredited)

Production
Working titles of the film are Oh Money, Money and Has Anybody Seen My Girl.

James Dean has an uncredited role as a young man in one of the soda fountain scenes.

Home media 
Universal released this film on DVD in 2006 as part of the Rock Hudson Screen Legend Collection, a 3-disc set featuring four other films (A Very Special Favor, The Golden Blade, The Last Sunset, and The Spiral Road). Universal then re-released this film in 2015 as a stand-alone DVD as part of its Universal Vault Series. There is also a Region 2 DVD release of this film.

References

External links

TV Guide plot synopsis and list of songs

1952 films
1952 comedy films
American comedy films
Films directed by Douglas Sirk
Films set in 1928
Universal Pictures films
James Dean
1950s English-language films
1950s American films